Maize High School is a public high school located in Maize, Kansas, United States. It is operated by Maize USD 266 school district, and serves students in grades 9-12. The current principal is Chris Botts. Maize High School is one of two high schools located within the city limits of Maize, Kansas. The school colors are red and white, although black is considered an unofficial third color. The average annual enrollment is approximately 2,000 students.

The athletic programs at Maize High School are known as the Eagles and compete in the 5A division, the second largest division in the state of Kansas according to the Kansas State High School Activities Association. Throughout its history, Maize has won 24 state championships in various sports.

Athletics
The Eagles compete in the Ark Valley Chisholm Trail League and are classified as a 5A school, the second largest classification in Kansas according to the Kansas State High School Activities Association.

State Championships

Maize High School offers the following sports:

Fall
 Football
 Volleyball
 Boys Cross-Country
 Girls Cross-Country
 Girls Golf
 Boys Soccer
 Girls Tennis
 Cheerleading

Winter
 Boys Basketball
 Girls Basketball
 Wrestling
 Boys Bowling
 Girls Bowling
 Winter Cheerleading
 Boys Swimming/Diving

Spring
 Baseball
 Boys Golf
 Boys Tennis
 Girls Soccer
 Girls Swimming/Diving
 Softball
 Boys Track and Field
 Girls Track and Field

Notable alumni
 Nate Robertson, Major League Baseball pitcher
 Ryan Schraeder, NFL player
 Kelsey Stewart, softball player, member United States women's national softball team that won the silver medal at the 2020 Summer Olympics

See also
 List of high schools in Kansas
 List of unified school districts in Kansas
Other high schools in Maize USD 266 school district
 Maize South High School in Maize

References

External links
 School website
 USD 266 school district website

Public high schools in Kansas
Schools in Sedgwick County, Kansas